Waldemar Anton (born 20 July 1996) is an Uzbekistani-German professional footballer who plays as a central defender for Bundesliga club VfB Stuttgart.

Career

Hannover 96 II 
Anton played eleven matches for Hannover 96 II and scored 1. Since Hannover 96 were in relegation  Anton and Mike-Steven Bähre had been signed to professional contracts to help the club

Hannover 96 
During the 2015–16 season, Anton made two appearances for Hannover 96, playing in a 2–1 win against VfB Stuttgart on 27 February 2016 and a 1–0 loss against Eintracht Frankfurt on 19 March 2016. His first Bundesliga goal was against Borussia Mönchengladbach on 15 April 2016.

VfB Stuttgart 
On 28 July 2020, he transferred to VfB Stuttgart on a four-year deal. On November 5, 2021 he extended his contract until 2025.

International career 
Anton was a youth international for Germany. He won the UEFA European Under-21 Championship in 2017 and was a runner-up in 2019.

Personal life 
Anton was born in Uzbekistan to parents of German and Russian descent.

Career statistics

Honours

International
Germany
UEFA European Under-21 Championship: 2017

References

External links

Living people
1996 births
People from Olmaliq
German footballers
Association football defenders
Germany under-21 international footballers
Uzbekistani footballers
Uzbekistani people of German descent
Citizens of Germany through descent
Bundesliga players
2. Bundesliga players
Regionalliga players
Hannover 96 players
Hannover 96 II players
VfB Stuttgart players